The 1946 Big Nine Conference football season was the 51st season of college football played by the member schools of the Big Nine Conference (also known as the Big Ten Conference and the Western Conference) and was a part of the 1946 college football season.

The 1946 Illinois Fighting Illini football team, under head coach Ray Eliot, won the Big Nine championship, compiled an 8–2 record, was ranked No. 5 in the final AP Poll, and defeated UCLA, 45–14, in the 1947 Rose Bowl. Illinois guard Alex Agase was a consensus first-team All-American and received the Chicago Tribune Silver Football trophy as the most valuable player in the conference.

Michigan, under head coach Fritz Crisler, compiled a 6-2-1 record, led the conference in both scoring offense (25.9 points per game) and scoring defense (8.1 points allowed per game), and was ranked No. 6 in the final AP Poll. The team's two losses came against No. 2 Army and No. 5 Illinois. Halfback Bob Chappuis received the team's most valuable player award.

Indiana, under head coach Bo McMillin, compiled a 6–3 record, finished third in the conference, and was ranked No. 20 in the final AP Poll. End Pete Pihos received the team's most valuable player award. Quarterback Ben Raimondi won first team All-Big Nine honors.

Season overview

Results and team statistics

Key
AP final = Team's rank in the final AP Poll of the 1946 season
AP high = Team's highest rank in the AP Poll throughout the 1946 season
PPG = Average of points scored per game
PAG = Average of points allowed per game
MVP = Most valuable player as voted by players on each team as part of the voting process to determine the winner of the Chicago Tribune Silver Football trophy

Regular season

Bowl games

In 1946, the Big Nine dropped its long-standing ban on participation in bowl games. Conference champion Illinois accepted an invitation to play UCLA in the 1947 Rose Bowl. The Illini defeated the Bruins by a 45–14 score. Buddy Young scored two touchdowns for Illinois, and Russ Steger returned an interception 68 yards for a touchdown.

All-Big Nine players

The following players were picked by the Associated Press (AP) and/or the United Press (UP) as first-team players on the 1946 All-Big Nine Conference football team.

All-Americans

At the end of the 1946 season, Big Nine players secured two of the consensus first-team picks for the 1946 College Football All-America Team. The Big Nine's consensus All-Americans were:

Other Big Nine players who were named first-team All-Americans by at least one selector were:

1947 NFL Draft
The following Big Nine players were among the first 100 picks of the 1947 NFL Draft:

References